Harry Caspar (4 November 1926 – 1 July 1988) was an Australian rules footballer who played with Carlton in the Victorian Football League (VFL).
Harry played five seasons at Sorrento, coaching in 1957-58 and received Life Membership.

Notes

External links 

Harry Caspar's profile at Blueseum

1926 births
Carlton Football Club players
1988 deaths
Australian rules footballers from Victoria (Australia)
Northcote Football Club players